Ivalu is a 2022 Danish short film directed by Anders Walter. 

The film was nominated for the 2023 Academy Award for Best Live Action Short Film.

Summary 

In Greenland, Pipaluk awakes to find her older sister Ivalu missing and her father claiming that she's run away. Pipaluk is distressed over the disappearance and believes Ivalu is coming to her in the form of a raven. Pipaluk searches their old hangout spots together, and reminisces on their past interactions. Gradually, it is revealed that Ivalu was being sexually abused by their father, and it is implied that Ivalu died by suicide in order to escape the abuse. Pipaluk sadly mourns her sister, wearing her confirmation outfit to a visit by the Queen of Denmark.

References 

2022 films
2022 short films
Danish short films